The Tenth Man may refer to:
The Tenth Man (novel), a 1985 novel by Graham Greene
The Tenth Man (1988 film), a film based on Greene's novel
The Tenth Man (Maugham play), a play by W. Somerset Maugham
The Tenth Man (1936 film), a film based on Maugham's play
The Tenth Man (Chayefsky play), a play by Paddy Chayefsky
The Tenth Man (2016 film), an Argentine film